Cornelis "Kees" Henricus Johannes de Boer (born 13 May 2000) is a Dutch professional footballer who plays as a midfielder for Eerste Divisie club VVV-Venlo. Besides the Netherlands, he has played in Wales.

Club career

Swansea City
De Boer played youth football for FC Volendam, Ajax and Swansea City. He made his professional debut for Swansea's first team in a 3–1 home win over Northampton Town at Liberty Stadium in the EFL Cup. De Boer replaced Yan Dhanda in the 90th minute.

ADO Den Haag
On 2 June 2020, De Boer signed a two-year contract with Eredivisie club ADO Den Haag, after his contract with Swansea had expired. He made his ADO league debut on 13 September 2020 in a 2–0 away loss to Heracles Almelo.

After a disastrous season, in which ADO finished bottom of the league and suffered relegation to the Eerste Divisie, De Boer exercised a relegation option in his contract to leave the club as a free agent.

VVV-Venlo
De Boer joined VVV-Venlo, who had suffered relegation alongside ADO, on 6 July 2021, signing a two-year contract with an option for an additional season. He was in the starting lineup on his debut for the club, a 2–2 home draw on the opening day of the 2021–22 season.

International career
De Boer is a Netherlands youth international, having gained two caps at under-15 level. On 10 February 2015, he made his debut for the Netherlands U15 in a 1–1 friendly draw against Serbia U15, providing the assist for Jurgen Ekkelenkamp's equalizer from his corner kick.

Career statistics

Club

References

External links
 
 

2000 births
Living people
Dutch footballers
Dutch expatriate footballers
Netherlands youth international footballers
Association football midfielders
FC Volendam players
AFC Ajax players
Swansea City A.F.C. players
ADO Den Haag players
VVV-Venlo players
Eredivisie players
Eerste Divisie players
Dutch expatriate sportspeople in Wales
Expatriate footballers in Wales
People from Volendam
Footballers from North Holland